The Journal of the Indian Academy of Applied Psychology is a biannual peer-reviewed academic journal published by the Indian Academy of Applied Psychology, for which it is the official journal. The editor-in-chief is Updesh Kumar (DIPR, DRDO).

The journal primarily publishes empirical research on applied psychology in different domains of life, and contains sections that include case studies, book reviews, and letters to the editor.

History 
The journal was established in 1964, two years after the founding of the Indian Academy of Applied Psychology (IAAP) in 1962. In 2012, coinciding with the 50th anniversary of the founding of the IAAP, the journal began publishing articles online in advance of print publication. The print edition currently consists of two issues per year, published in January and July.

Abstracting and indexing 
The journal is abstracted and indexed in PsycINFO, Scopus,
IndMED, 
and NCERT Educational Abstracts.

The journal's website also lists it as indexed in Indian Psychological Abstracts & Reviews,
an abstracting service published as a journal through 2011.

References

External links 
 

Publications established in 1964
Applied psychology journals
Biannual journals
English-language journals
Academic journals associated with learned and professional societies of India